Toussaint Louverture International Airport  is an international airport in Tabarre, a commune of Port-au-Prince in Haiti. The airport is currently the busiest in Haiti and is an operating hub for Sunrise Airways.

It is informally called "the Maïs-Gâté airport", named after the area in the Cul-de-Sac Plain where the airport was built.

History 

During the United States occupation of Haiti the United States Marine Corps stationed Marine Observation units using HS-1 and HS-2 aircraft in what later became Bowen Field (c. 1919).

In 1942, the USMC was sent to Haiti to build a facility to service Douglas O-38 aircraft used by Haiti Air Corps to observe Nazi German activity in the region. 
The USMC built Bowen Field (also known as Chancerelles Airport), a small civilian and military airport located near Chancerelles area near the Baie de Port-au-Prince. Bowen Field was used by Haiti Air Corps for mail (1943) and passenger (1944) services, then succeeded by the Compagnie haïtienne de transports aériens beginning in 1961. In the 1950s and the 1960s, it served as an airbase for the US military in Haiti. The current airport located further northeast of Bowen Field was developed with grant money from the US government and mostly money collected from Haitian people (taxes, lottery, etc.), opened as François Duvalier International Airport in 1965, after the Haitian president at the time, François "Papa Doc" Duvalier. The old Bowen field was decommissioned after 1994 and is now hosts Internally Displaced Persons Camp and Centre Sportif. The runway is now part of Avenue Haile Selassie.

Duvalier's son and successor, Jean-Claude Duvalier, resigned in 1986. The airport was renamed Port-au-Prince International Airport. Haitian President Jean Bertrand Aristide renamed the airport again as Toussaint Louverture International Airport in 2003 to honor Toussaint Louverture, the leader of the Haitian Revolution.

The airport was badly damaged by the 2010 Haiti earthquake. On 25 November 2012, Haitian President Michel Joseph Martelly opened the newly repaired arrivals terminal.

On 7 July 2021, following the assassination of Haitian President Jovenel Moïse, the airport was closed and flights were sent back to their origins.

Facilities 
The main building of the airport works as the International Terminal. It is a two-story concrete and glass structure. Lounges and a few retail stores are on the second floor of the main building. Check-in counters, gates and immigration facilities are on the lower floor. The Guy Malary Terminal (named after former Haitian Justice Minister Guy Malary) is used for domestic flights. There are further buildings used for general aviation and cargo flights. The airport has three jet bridges, but most passengers walk onto aircraft from mobile stairs. The ramp area can handle 12 planes.

The airport is to be re-designed completely by the year 2015. The re-making of the airport is to add 14 gates to the terminal and also will make the main passenger terminal bigger. As of 15 June 2016, a taxiway is under construction to increase traffic capacity, as taxiing aircraft currently must use the active runway to taxi to their takeoff position. Work is being performed by China National Automation Control System Corporation which has multiple large construction contracts with the Haitian government.

Airlines and destinations

Passenger

The following airlines operate regular scheduled and charter services at the airport:

Cargo

Statistics

Access 
The airport can be accessed by car (with parking space next to the terminal building) or by National Bus Route 1.

Accidents and incidents
 3 March 1980: A Learjet (N211MB) operating on a corporate charter flight on behalf of 'Merchant Bank' crashed in the hills on arrival at airport. One passenger and two crew members died.
 12 July 1980: A Douglas C-47 crashed on approach, killing all three people on board. The aircraft was being used illegally to transport marijuana.
Two crew members and 18 passengers (which were illegal immigrants to Guadeloupe) were killed.
 12 February 1996: A Haiti Express GAF Nomad aircraft (N224E) crashed shortly after taking off. Two crew members and 8 passengers died.
There were no fatal injuries.
 11 September 2007: Only eleven days after the previous accident another plane crash of a Caribintair Cessna Grand Caravan (HH-CAW) occurred near the airport, this time upon landing  short of the runway.
 26 May 2013: A Brazilian Air Force KC-137 transport aircraft veered off the runway after an engine fire during takeoff, crashing into the grass next to the runway. The plane was carrying 121 Brazilian soldiers deployed to the UN stabilization force in Haiti (MINUSTAH) but no injuries were reported. Small aircraft were allowed to resume flying on Monday, but large aircraft that could not pass the KC-137 (mostly to/from the USA) were suspended for days.

See also
 Jacmel Airport, another airport used for 2010 earthquake relief flights in Haiti
 Operation Unified Response, US military relief effort for the January 2010 earthquake in Haiti
 List of airports in Haiti
 List of the busiest airports in the Caribbean

References

External links

Official website

Airports in Haiti
Buildings and structures in Port-au-Prince
2010 Haiti earthquake relief
Airports established in 1965